Piluwa Khola Hydropower Project (Nepali: पिलुवा खोला जलविद्युत आयोजना) is a run-of-river hydro-electric plant located in  Sankhuwasabha District of Nepal. The flow from Piluwa River is used to generate 3.0 MW electricity. The design flow is 3.5 m3/s and head is 112.5 m.  The plant is owned and developed by Arun Valley Hydropower Development Company Pvt. Ltd. The plant started generating electricity since 2060-06-01 B.S. The generation licence will expire in 2097-04-32 BS, after which the plant will be handed over to the government.

The power station is connected to the national grid and it sells electricity to Nepal Electricity Authority.

See also
List of power stations in Nepal

References

Hydroelectric power stations in Nepal
Run-of-the-river power stations
Dams in Nepal
Buildings and structures in Sankhuwasabha District